New York State Route 458 (NY 458) is a state highway in the North Country of New York in the United States. The route follows a generally northwest–southeast alignment between the two points, serving only small hamlets as it crosses an otherwise rural area of the North Country. NY 458 was assigned on July 1, 1972 to the former routing of NY 72 east of the Hopkinton hamlet of Nicholville. Prior to being signed as part of NY 72 in 1930, it was designated as part of NY 56 in the 1920s.

Route description
NY 458 begins at a junction with NY 11B in Hopkinton at the western fringe of the Lawrence hamlet of Nicholville. The route heads southeast, loosely paralleling the St. Regis River as it proceeds through rural eastern St. Lawrence County. After , it passes into both the Franklin County town of Waverly and Adirondack Park.

Now within the park boundaries, NY 458 crosses over the Lake Ozonia Outlet on its way eastward to the hamlet of St. Regis Falls, the largest community on the entire route. The route crosses the St. Regis River twice and intersects County Route 5 (CR 5), a connector to the hamlet of Moira  to the north, within St. Regis Falls. At the junction with CR 5, here named North Main Street but known as Moira–St. Regis Falls Road north of Adirondack Park, the highway turns south to follow South Main Street out of the community.

NY 458 continues southeast through Waverly to the hamlet known as Santa Clara in the town of the same name. Instead of traversing the mountain, the highway bypasses it to the south. East of the peak, NY 458 turns southeast and begins to parallel the east branch of the St. Regis River. This pairing remains intact through the towns of Santa Clara and Duane to Brighton, where NY 458 ends at NY 30.

History

The entirety of modern NY 458 was originally designated as part of NY 56, a route extending from Massena to Brighton via Winthrop and Nicholville, in the mid-1920s. NY 56 was realigned in 1927 to continue west from Nicholville to a new terminus in Potsdam. In the 1930 renumbering of state highways in New York, NY 56 was renumbered to NY 72. The portion of NY 72 east of Nicholville remained unchanged until July 1, 1972 when NY 72 was truncated to its current eastern terminus in Hopkinton. The former routing of NY 72 from Nicholville to Brighton was renumbered to NY 458.

Major intersections

See also

References

External links

458
Transportation in St. Lawrence County, New York
Transportation in Franklin County, New York